Lee Ho-jae (born 2 May 1941) is a South Korean actor. Lee began his career on stage in 1963, in the play Of Mice and Men, and has appeared in numerous works of Korean theatre, film and television.

He has been praised as a master of speech for his restrained emotion acting. In 2011 Lee was awarded the Bogwan Order of Cultural Merit by South Korean government.

In 1977, with his fellow actor Jeon Moo-song, Lee performed in play Crown Prince Hamyeol (an adaptation of Hamlet) at La MaMa in New York City, which marked the first time a Korean theatre troupe had traveled outside Korea.

Career

Early career 
Lee was born in Seoul and grew up in the Jongno-dong neighborhood. He's the eldest of 6 siblings, 3 boys and 3 girls. His father had a big business in dyes and pigments. Lee didn't plan to be an actor. He was an ice hockey player at Whimoon High School in Seoul. In the spring of 1960, He was a freshmen in Yonsei University's Department of Political Science and Diplomacy. Because of his good voice, a senior appointed Lee him to read the April 19 Revolution Manifesto in student protest, but that incident made Lee expelled from university. He was wandering for two years, then in autumn 1962, he decided to enter newly established Korean Theater Academy, founded by Dongnang  (1905-1974) which was predecessor of today Department of Theater and Film of Seoul Institute of the Arts. Class of 1962 was the first batch from the academy. Lee's fellow classmate included Shin Gu, Jeon Moo-song, Ban Hyo-jeong (who did not graduate), and playwright Yoon Dae-seong.

In 1963, Lee debuted on stage at the Myeongdong National Theater in 1963 as Lenny Small in Of Mice and Men by John Steinbeck, produced by theater company belong to his friend Kim Bul-rae (former professor at Hongik University). Kim coaxed Lee into joining the play in exchange of free drinks at his mom's bar.

Career from 1964-1999 
After graduation in 1964, Lee and fellow classmate Jeon Moo-song became member of Dongnang Repertoire Theater Company. In 1966 he was called to enlist for 36 months. Lee fulfilled his mandatory military enlistment by participating in the Vietnam War and discharged in 1969. He's back to the theater company after working in a company for a short time. His major works with Dongnang Repertoire Theater Company were works of playwright Oh Taeseok, such as his original works Chobun and Tae (lifecord) and also Sootduki Play (1974), adaptation of Scapin the Schemer by Molière.

In 1975 Lee with his fellow actor Jeon Moo-song and playwright Oh Taeseok joined National Theater Company of Korea (NTCK). His most memorable and notable work there was Henrik Ibsen's play Peer Gynt. 

In 1977, Lee with Jeon Moo-song and Oh Taeseok, joined Dongnang Repertory Theater Company's World Tour Return Commemorative Performance. Dongrang Repertory theater company led by CEO Yoo Deok-hyung (president of Seoul Institute of the Arts at that time) toured the world for about three months from March 9 to May 30 19777, sponsored byJoongang Ilbo, Dongyang Broadcasting, and the American Headquarter of International Theatre Institute (ITI), co-hosted by the Rockefeller Foundation in the United States). This was first full-fledged overseas tour of a Korean theater. The repertoire of this world tour theater performance is "Tae (Life Cord)" and Crown Prince Hamyeol (directed by Ahn Min-su, an adaptation of Shakespeare's original Hamlet).

Dongnang Repertory Theater Company's World Tour Return Commemorative Performance was held as an opportunity to attend the "World Theater Month" commemorative event hosted by the American Headquarter of International Theatre Institute (ITI), which held in New York, US, from March 15. Following the performance at the commemorative event, the troupe toured around the U.S. in Dallas, Minneapolis, Los Angeles, and Hawaii, as well as in Paris, France and the Netherlands. Before leaving the country, the troupe performed a commemorative performance of Tae (Life Cord), written by Oh Tae-seok, directed by Ahn Min-soo), one of the tour works, at the annex of the Seoul Citizens Hall from 22 to 24 February (hosted by JoongAng Ilbo and Dongyang Broadcasting). They started the tour at La MaMa in New York City.

Lee also joined Dongnang Repertory Theater Company in invitation performance of Crown Prince Hamyeol in American Headquarter of International Theatre Institute (ITI) World Theater Day, from 15 to 20 June 1977 in Los Angeles, United States.

Lee recognized as one of notable actor in history of South Korea modern theatre in the 70s. Lee was nicknamed "The Eternal Watchman of the Theater World" because he stayed in the theatre even when his seniors and colleagues left for television dramas and movies. Lee wanted to be financially independent by only do plays, but due to circumstances after marriage with children, since 1980s he was forced to also do radio, television dramas and films.

After five years with NTCK, he decided to be a freelancer. In the 80s, he worked with different theater company such as company Sanwoolim, Seongjwa, and Hyundai Theater.

In 1994, Lee debuted on the musical stage in The stars love each other with meaning in the world. The musical written by an active psychiatrist, Kim Jong-il, depicts the devastated mental world of Jung Hoon, who suffers from mental illness, through various events that happen in a dream overnight which is a reminder of the importance of life. Directed by Song Mi-sook, this work was performed at the Hakjeon Small Theater from December 1, 1994, to Januari, 1995.

Career in 2000s 
In 2005 Lee performed in the play The story of two knights moving around the world, by Betsuyaku Minoru, one of the leading playwrights in modern Japan.

One of their work together was play Let's Go Over the Hill (2007), a story of a love triangle between three friends at their sunset age. Lee also worked with National Theater Company's Oh Young-soo and Jeon Yang-ja. Directed by Lee Seong-sin, it was performed at the Hakjeon Blue Small Theater in Daehak-ro.

In 2006, Lee and Jeon Moo-song joined play Dragon and Tiger Sangbak, directed by Oh Tae-seok. It was a reunion project after 8 years since A Thousand Years of Beast in 1997 as their last project together. It was exactly 30 years since the three of them collaborated to put on a performance at the Namsan Drama Center where they started their career.

In 2010, Lee performed in the play Even if I deceive you (written by Lee Man-hee, directed by Ahn Kyung-mo to commemorates his 70th birthday.

In 2015, Lee joined project to celebrate the 110th anniversary of Dongnang Yoo Chi-jin, reenactment of The Han River Flows. The play performed at the Drama Center of Namsan Arts Center in Yejang-dong, Seoul. Oh Tae-seok, chair professor at Seoul Institute of the Arts, was the director and Dong-rang's son, Yoo Deok-hyeong, president of Seoul Institute of the Arts, will be the artistic director.

In 2017, four masters of the theater, met at the 2nd Neulpureun Theater Festival. Lee Ho-jae and fellow actor Oh Hyun-kyung represent actors, Director Kim Do-hoon and playwright Noh Kyung-shik represent creator. The masters have average age of 79 years old. In this festival Lee Ho-jae performed his play Let's Go Over the Hill. This was written by Lee Man-hee as tribute to him and the time of its premiere in 2007, it received a great response from the middle-aged audience with his warm and pleasant gaze toward the silver age and delicious lines. Directed by Choi Yong-hoon, the play performed at Daehangno Arts Theater from August 17 to 27, 2018.

In 2011, Lee was awarded the 2011 Order of Cultural Merit (Level 3) by the government.

Since 2018, Lee Ho-jae became one of member of Theater, Film and Dance Division of The National Academy of Arts.

In 2022, Lee performed on stage to commemorate the 60th acting anniversary. Lee Man-hee wrote a new play titled Jealousy dedicated to Lee Ho-jae. The play is centered on 'Wan-gyu' (Lee Ho-jae), who lives and runs a business alone in a plastic house office after divorce, and 'Chun-san' (Nam Myeong-ryeol), a friend. The drama depicts the romance of twilight with Sujeong (Nam Ki-ae), a local drugstore pharmacist. Directed by Choi Yong-hoon, the play performed from 27 May to 5 June 2022 at Hakjeon Blue, Daehangno, Seoul.

Filmography

Film

Television

Drama series

Variety show

Stage

Theater

Theater play in 2000s

As freelancer

As member of NTOK

As part of Dongnang Repertoire World Tour

As member of Dongnang Repertoire Theater Company

Awards and nominations

State honors

Notes

References

External links 
 
 
  
 Lee Ho-jae at Daum Encyclopedia 
 Lee Ho-jae at Naver 
 Lee Ho-jae at PlayDB 

Living people
People from Seoul
Male actors from Seoul
1941 births
Seoul Institute of the Arts alumni 
South Korean male stage actors
South Korean male television actors
South Korean male film actors
20th-century South Korean male actors 
21st-century South Korean male actors